Franz Obrist was an Italian luger who competed from the mid–1980s to the early 1990s. A natural track luger, he won three singles medals at the FIL World Luge Natural Track Championships with one silver in 1994 and two bronzes in 1992 and 1996.

Obrist won two men's singles medals at the FIL European Luge Natural Track Championships with a gold in 1991 and a bronze in 1993.

References

Natural track European Championships results 1970-2006.
Natural track World Championships results: 1979-2007

Italian lugers
Italian male lugers
Year of birth missing (living people)
Sportspeople from Südtirol
Living people